These are the official results of the Men's 1,500 metres event at the 1978 European Championships in Prague, Czechoslovakia. The final was held on 3 September 1978.

Medalists

Results

Final
3 September

Heats
1 September

Heat 1

Heat 2

Heat 3

Participation
According to an unofficial count, 34 athletes from 19 countries participated in the event.

 (2)
 (1)
 (1)
 (3)
 (2)
 (3)
 (1)
 (1)
 (2)
 (1)
 (1)
 (1)
 (3)
 (1)
 (2)
 (3)
 (1)
 (3)
 (2)

See also
 1974 Men's European Championships 1,500 metres (Rome)
 1976 Men's Olympic 1,500 metres (Montreal)
 1980 Men's Olympic 1,500 metres (Moscow)
 1982 Men's European Championships 1,500 metres (Athens)
 1983 Men's World Championships 1,500 metres (Helsinki)
 1984 Men's Olympic 1,500 metres (Los Angeles)

References

 Results

1500 metres
1500 metres at the European Athletics Championships